Syngrou–Fix, also known as Sygrou–Fix on metro station signage, is an interchange station between Athens Metro Line 2 and the Athens Tram.

The station name is derived from Syngrou Avenue, where it is located, and the former Fix brewery, which was on the road near the station site.

History
The station is part of the original Athens Metro project that was funded in 1991. During the first stages of construction it was named Neos Kosmos (the subsequent Neos Kosmos station was then named Analatos). The station opened on 15 November 2000 along with the Syntagma-Dafni extension, 10 months after the first section of the system had opened.

Entrances
There are two entrances. One is located in Drakou street, a pedestrian road in Koukaki. The other is located within the 1996 Olympic Winners' Park between Sygrou Ave. and Kallirrois street. The second entrance is near the tram stop.

Tram stop 

The tram stop is simply known as Fix, and is located on the northeastern side of the road junction with Kallirois Avenue and Irakleous Street. Since 6 December 2021, Fix serves Line 6 of the Athens Tram.

Gallery

References

Athens Metro stations
Fix
Railway stations opened in 2000
2000 establishments in Greece